Events from the year 1952 in France.

Incumbents
President: Vincent Auriol 
President of the Council of Ministers: 
 until 20 January: René Pleven
 20 January-8 March: Edgar Faure
 starting 8 March: Antoine Pinay

Events
25 February – Battle of Hòa Bình ends in defeat for French forces by the Việt Minh in Vietnam.
1 October – Operation Bretagne begins in Vietnam.
19 October – Alain Bombard begins to sail from Canary Islands to Barbados in 65 days; he reaches them 23 December.
29 October – Operation Lorraine begins.
October – Battle of Nà Sản begins.
8 November – Operation Lorraine ends with no decisive result.
2 December – Battle of Nà Sản ends in French victory.
Luxury brand Givenchy is founded by fashion designer Hubert de Givenchy.

Arts and literature
1 June – Roman Catholic Church bans books of André Gide.

Sport
25 June – Tour de France begins.
19 July – Tour de France ends, won by Fausto Coppi of Italy.

Births
25 January – Sara Mandiano, singer and songwriter.
15 February – Dominique Mouillot, business leader.
26 March – Didier Pironi, motor racing driver (died 1987)
27 March – Maria Schneider, actress (died 2011)
1 April – Bernard Stiegler, philosopher (died 2020)
2 April – Thierry Le Luron, impersonator and humorist (died 1986)
23 April – Jean-Dominique Bauby, journalist, author and editor (died 1997)
11 May – Renaud, singer
3 June – Dominique Laffin, actress (died 1985)
7 June – Hubert Auriol, motor racing driver (died 2021)
27 June – Lydia Schenardi, politician and Member of the European Parliament
16 July – Jean Paul Gaultier, fashion designer
31 August – Edwy Plenel, journalist and editor of Le Monde
23 October – Pierre Moerlen, drummer and percussionist (died 2005)
25 October – Florence Picaut, athlete
October – François Ovide, guitarist (died 2002)
4 December – Farid Chopel, actor, comedian and singer (died 2008)

Full date unknown
Didier Dubois, mathematician
René Renou, wine expert (died 2006)
Françoise Thébaud, historian, professor emeritus

Deaths
11 January – Jean de Lattre de Tassigny, general, military hero of World War II (born 1889)
18 May – Henry Bérenger, diplomat (born 1867)
16 July – Jean Chantavoine, musicologist and biographer (born 1877)
3 November – Louis Verneuil, playwright and screenwriter (born 1893)
18 November – Paul Éluard, poet (born 1895)
19 November – Marcel Henriot, World War I flying ace (born 1896)
27 November – Abel Lefranc, literary historian (born 1863)
5 December – André Lefaur, actor (born 1879)
Full date unknown
Gabrielle Petit (feminist), feminist activist, anticlerical, libertarian socialist, and newspaper editor (born 1860)

See also
 List of French films of 1952

References

1950s in France